René Alexandre Arnoux (born 4 July 1948) is a French former racing driver who competed in 12 Formula One seasons (1978 to 1989). He participated in 165 World Championship Grands Prix (149 starts) winning seven of them, achieving 22 podium finishes and scoring 181 career points. His best finish in the World Drivers' Championship was third in 1983 for Ferrari. In 1977, Arnoux won the European Formula Two Championship. In 2006 he raced in the inaugural season of the Grand Prix Masters series for retired F1 drivers.

Early career

In 1973, Arnoux enrolled in Winfield Racing School and graduated as the top student with the prestigious Volant Shell Competition Schollership, sponsored by Shell Oil for a free Formule Renault season. He moved into Formula Two in 1974 with Elf, taking fourth place on his debut at Nogaro. In 1975 he moved to Formule Super Renault and won the title. For 1976, Arnoux moved back to Formula Two with an Elf-sponsored, works Martini-Renault, winning three races and narrowly losing the title to Jean-Pierre Jabouille. However, he won the  European Championship, again driving a Martini-Renault. Arnoux won races at Silverstone, Hockenheim, Pau and Nogaro, which along with second places at Enna-Pergusa and Estoril saw him finish 12 points clear of American Eddie Cheever who was driving for Ron Dennis' Project Four Racing, and 14 points clear of teammate Didier Pironi.

Formula One

Martini and Surtees
However, in an organisation with insufficient means to compete in the highest echelon of the sport, he was unable to demonstrate his abilities and Martini abandoned Formula One during the season, having run short of money. Arnoux's best finishes for Martini were two 9th places in Belgium and Austria. He failed to qualify in South Africa, and failed to pre-qualify in Monaco and Germany.

Arnoux moved to Surtees for the last two races of the season, but once again found himself in a team on the edge of failure. In his two races for the team, his best finish was his debut where he placed 9th at Watkins Glen for the United States Grand Prix. He qualified the Surtees TS20 in 21st place at Watkins Glen, while teammate Beppe Gabbiani failed to qualify. His last race for the team in Canada saw him qualify 16th but retire just after half distance when the Ford DFV engine failed.

Renault
In the  season, the factory Renault team entered two cars for the first time since its debut in 1977. The team's only victory of the year was taken by Arnoux's teammate Jean-Pierre Jabouille at the French Grand Prix at the Dijon-Prenois circuit, but Arnoux took the headlines due to a fierce wheel-banging battle with the Flat-12 Ferrari of Gilles Villeneuve for second place, which Villeneuve won. In the second half of the season, Arnoux took four top-six finishes, including three podium places; Jabouille's Dijon victory was his only points finish of the year.

In , Arnoux took his first two Formula One victories, the first being at Interlagos circuit in Brazil. His second win came in the very next race at the Kyalami circuit in South Africa, where the thinner air at high altitude gave the turbocharged Renault RE20 a power advantage over its mostly Cosworth-powered rivals. Following this race, Arnoux was leading the World Championship for the first time. He would not lose the championship lead until Round 6 in Monaco. The season though was punctuated by unreliability from the turbocharged Renault V6 engine. Although he would later finish second in the Dutch Grand Prix at Zandvoort, he would finish the season in 6th place with 29 points, 38 points behind World Champion Alan Jones.

Their rivalry on-track flared up off the track and relations between the two men deteriorated. The conflict reached its peak at the 1982 French Grand Prix at the Circuit Paul Ricard. The drivers took Renault's first one-two in Formula One, Arnoux finishing ahead of Prost. Prost was furious, considering that his teammate had not kept to the team orders agreed before the race, according to which he should have ceded the win to Prost, who was better placed in the  championship. Arnoux replied that no orders had been given before the race and that he was free to drive his own race. He took one other win at the Italian Grand Prix at the end of the season. He suffered a high speed crash after losing a wheel going into the banked Tarzan corner at the end of the long straight in the 1982 Dutch Grand Prix, though his car's momentum was largely stopped by a sand trap and tyre barrier.

Ferrari
With three victories, at the Canadian, German, and Dutch Grands Prix, Arnoux was in contention for the world title until the final race of the season, the South African Grand Prix. He retired from that race with engine failure, and finished the season third, behind Nelson Piquet and Prost. Both Arnoux and Tambay became favourites with the Tifosi for their hard-charging styles, and their conjuncted results saw Ferrari win the 1983 Constructors' Championship. Arnoux's win at Zandvoort turned out to be the seventh and final win of his Formula One career.

With the McLarens of Prost and Niki Lauda dominating , Arnoux had a less successful second season at Ferrari, only finishing 6th with 27 points, with his new teammate Michele Alboreto progressively taking the initiative and team leadership from him. After three wins and four pole positions in 1983, Arnoux failed to win or claim a pole position in 1984 (Alboreto won the Belgian Grand Prix from pole with Arnoux starting second and finishing third), though he finished second in San Marino and Dallas where he was forced to start from the pits due to an electrical fault on the warm-up lap and managed to keep his car out of trouble on the crumbling track. The only Grand Prix ever held in Dallas was also the last time Arnoux achieved a Formula One podium finish. As the season progressed, Arnoux appeared to lack motivation, and after finishing 4th in the opening race of the  championship in Brazil, he left Ferrari by mutual consent. His place in the team was taken by Swedish driver Stefan Johansson. He was seen in the Brabham pits at Imola in Round 3, sparking rumours that he would join the team then owned by Bernie Ecclestone, but nothing came of it and he was rarely seen at races for the rest of the season.

Ligier
The Pirelli-tyred Ligiers proved uncompetitive as the season progressed. Arnoux had two teammates in 1986. For the first half of the season his teammate was French driver Jacques Laffite. However, Laffite's career ended when he broke both of his legs in a first corner crash at Brands Hatch in the British Grand Prix. From the following race Laffite was replaced with another French driver, Philippe Alliot.

For , Ligier were to have exclusive use of a new,  four-cylinder turbocharged Alfa Romeo engine in the new Ligier JS29. Arnoux scored the team's only point during the season with a 6th place in Belgium. The race at Spa also saw the best finish for his teammate Piercarlo Ghinzani who finished 7th.

 was to prove the final year for turbos in Formula One and Ligier took the chance to race the new, 3.5-litre Judd V8 engine. The Ligier JS31 proved to be uncompetitive, with both Arnoux and new teammate Stefan Johansson failing to qualify several times. Both drivers complained that even in dry conditions the lack of grip saw them forced to drive with a wet weather technique. Arnoux failed to qualify twice during the season (San Marino and France, while Johansson failed to make the grid six times. Arnoux's best finish of the year was 10th place in the Portuguese Grand Prix. It was the first time since his debut season in 1978 that he had failed to score a World Championship point. His DNQ at Imola was the first time he had failed to qualify for a race since the 1981 Belgian Grand Prix. In the final race of the season in Adelaide, he took out race leader Gerhard Berger while being lapped at the 1988 Australian Grand Prix. Arnoux was criticised, but Berger said that he was experiencing a "very long" brake pedal which meant he could not stop to avoid Arnoux, nor pass him as easily as he normally would have. He also said that with his turbo boost turned up to full, the Ferrari would have run out of fuel long before the race ended.

In , the new Ford DFR powered Ligier JS33 showed promise. Arnoux's driving had attracted some criticism, and he was frequently accused of not using his mirrors and blocking faster cars in qualifying and when being lapped. During the 1989 Monaco Grand Prix, BBC commentator Murray Walker remarked that Arnoux's claimed reason for going so slow at that stage of his career was that he was used to turbo powered cars and that the naturally aspirated cars were "a completely different kettle of fish to drive — he says". Walker's co-commentator,  World Champion James Hunt said "And all I can say to that is bullshit". Arnoux received criticism after the race for holding up faster cars, with former Renault teammate Prost in particular held up by the Ligier which refused to let the McLaren past for a number of laps. This cost Prost some 20 seconds in his pursuit of teammate Ayrton Senna.

Arnoux finished his career with 181 World Championship points, with his last points coming from a 5th place at the 1989 Canadian Grand Prix. His last race was the very wet 1989 Australian Grand Prix in Adelaide. He was second fastest to the McLaren-Honda of outgoing World Champion and pole-sitter Ayrton Senna in the extra half-hour warm-up that was scheduled to let drivers and teams set up their cars for wet conditions after three days of sunny weather, but in the race, his Ligier was pushed into retirement by the Arrows of Eddie Cheever after four laps.

Post-racing career
After retiring from driving, Arnoux started an indoor karting business, consisting of four tracks in France. He also owns and manages two factories, and frequently appears and drives in historical events on behalf of Renault.

Arnoux was one of the drivers invited to take part in the Grand Prix Masters championship in 2006 and 2007, restricted to former Formula One drivers. In 2007 and 2008 he drove for the Renault H&C Classic Team, when he presented and drove Alain Prost's F1 car from 1983 at World Series by Renault events.

Racing record

Career summary

Complete European F5000 Championship results
(key) (Races in bold indicate pole position; races in italics indicate fastest lap.)

Complete European Formula Two Championship results
(key) (Races in bold indicate pole position; races in italics indicate fastest lap)

Complete Formula One World Championship results
(key) (Races in bold indicate pole position, Races in italics indicate fastest lap)

 Race was stopped with less than 75% of laps completed, half points awarded.

Complete Formula One Non-Championship results
(key) (Races in italics indicate fastest lap)

24 Hours of Le Mans results

Complete Grand Prix Masters results
(key) Races in bold indicate pole position, races in italics indicate fastest lap.

References

Sources
Profile at GrandPrix.com

1948 births
Living people
French racing drivers
French Formula Renault 2.0 drivers
French Formula One drivers
Formula One race winners
Surtees Formula One drivers
Ferrari Formula One drivers
Ligier Formula One drivers
European Formula Two Championship drivers
Grand Prix Masters drivers
Renault Formula One drivers
24 Hours of Le Mans drivers
Sportspeople from Isère
EuroInternational drivers